is a former Japanese football player.

Playing career
Ushibana was born in Satsumasendai on September 21, 1977. After graduating from Meiji University, he joined J1 League club Avispa Fukuoka in 2000. Although he played several matches as midfielder until 2001, the club was relegated to J2 League from 2002. In 2002, he played many matches as midfielder until summer. However he could not play at all in the match from summer. In 2003, he moved to Japan Football League club YKK (later YKK AP). He became a regular player and played many matches until 2007. In 2008, he moved to Prefectural Leagues club Toyama Shinjo Club. He retired end of 2008 season.

Club statistics

References

External links

1977 births
Living people
Meiji University alumni
Association football people from Kagoshima Prefecture
Japanese footballers
J1 League players
J2 League players
Japan Football League players
Avispa Fukuoka players
Kataller Toyama players
Association football midfielders